Extinction probability is the chance of an inherited trait becoming extinct as a function of time t.  If t = ∞ this may be the complement of the chance of becoming a universal trait.

Statistical genetics
Stochastic processes
Population models